Óbidos may refer to:

 Óbidos, Brazil, a town in the State of Pará
 Óbidos Municipality, a municipality in the Oeste Subregion of Portugal
 Óbidos, Portugal, the municipal seat of the municipality of Óbidos
 Óbidos DOC, a wine produced there
 Obidos (software)